He Jiaxin (born 5 March 1996) is a Chinese female badminton player.

Achievements

BWF World Junior Championships
Girls' Doubles

Asia Junior Championships
Girls' Doubles

References

External links 
 

1996 births
Living people
Badminton players from Guangdong
Chinese female badminton players
21st-century Chinese women